Aylacostoma guaraniticum is a species of freshwater snail, an aquatic gastropod mollusc in the family Thiaridae. This species disappeared after the building of the Yacyretá Dam on the Paraná River, in between Argentina and Paraguay. Although listed as extinct in the wild by the IUCN, no captive population survives meaning that it now is entirely extinct.

References

Thiaridae
Gastropods described in 1953
Taxonomy articles created by Polbot